Freedom Together! is an album by pianist Jaki Byard recorded in 1966 and released on the Prestige label.

Reception

In a contemporary review, Down Beat gave the album 4 stars, and commented on the balance between freedom and structure in the performances: "The title track is a most eloquent refutation of the avant-garde illiterates, while being an object lesson in how to attain the highest form of personal musical freedom." Allmusic awarded the album 4 stars, with the review by Scott Yanow stating, "This is a particularly unusual and colorful set, for Byard not only plays piano, but makes appearances on celeste, electric piano, vibes, drums and tenor sax... Byard is in excellent form".

Track listing 
All compositions by Jaki Byard except as noted
 "Freedom Together" – 11:29  
 "Getting to Know You" (Oscar Hammerstein II, Richard Rodgers) – 4:54  
 "Ode to Prez" – 3:21  
 "Nocturne for Contrabass" – 6:00  
 "Just You, Just Me" (Jesse Greer, Raymond Klages) – 5:18  
 "Night Leaves" – 6:22  
 "Young at Heart" (Carolyn Leigh, Johnny Richards) – 2:07

Personnel 
Jaki Byard – piano, electric piano, celeste, vibraphone, tenor saxophone, drums 
Richard Davis – bass, cello
Alan Dawson – drums, vibraphone, timpani
Junior Parker – vocals (tracks 2 & 6)

References 

Jaki Byard albums
1966 albums
Albums produced by Don Schlitten
Prestige Records albums